Petar Stanev (born 22 September 1975) in Plovdiv) is a Bulgarian footballer who plays for Dimitrovgrad. He is a central forward.

Career
Stanev started his career playing football at his local club Maritsa. Then moving onwards to Lokomotiv Sofia, Chernomorets Burgas, CSKA Sofia and Akademik Sofia. In September 2008 he signed with Nigerian club Heartland F.C., Stanev featured in the second half of their pre-season friendly against Dolphins FC at the Sam Okwaraji Memorial Stadium in Orlu.

Heartland won 1-0 through an 87th-minute goal scored by Ikechukwu Ibeneghu, but Stanov was the cynosure of all eyes, clearly different from the other 21 players on the pitch because of his skin colour.

His nickname is "The Queen".

References

External links
 Heartland get Bulgarian striker

1975 births
Living people
Bulgarian footballers
Association football forwards
First Professional Football League (Bulgaria) players
FC Chernomorets Burgas players
FC Lokomotiv 1929 Sofia players
PFC CSKA Sofia players
Akademik Sofia players
Heartland F.C. players
Bulgarian expatriate footballers
Expatriate footballers in Nigeria